Hagimus (rendered also as Khadzhimus) is a village in Căușeni District, Moldova.

Site : https://web.archive.org/web/20100817023352/http://hagimus.ru/

References

Villages of Căușeni District